Skaggs & Rice is an album by American guitarist Tony Rice and multi-instrumentalist Ricky Skaggs, released in 1980. The album was reissued in April 2012.

Track listing 
 "Bury Me Beneath the Willow" (Traditional) – 2:43  
 "Mansions For Me" (Bill Monroe) – 3:39  
 "There's More Pretty Girls Than One" (Traditional) – 2:58  
 "Memories Of Mother And Dad" (Albert Price) – 2:28  
 "Where The Soul Of Man Never Dies" (Traditional) – 2:27  
 "Talk About Suffering" (Traditional) – 2:10  
 "Will The Roses Bloom (Where She Lies Sleeping)" (Bevins Brothers) – 2:47  
 "Tennessee Blues" (Bill Monroe) – 2:49  
 "The Old Crossroads" (Charlie Monroe) – 2:42  
 "Have You Someone (In Heaven Awaiting)" (Carter Stanley, Ralph Stanley) – 2:52

Personnel
Tony Rice – guitar, vocals
Ricky Skaggs – mandolin, vocals
Production notes
Richard Adler – engineer
Donivan Cowart – engineer
Connie Potter – assistant engineer
Jon Sievert – photography
Raymond Simone – artwork, design, illustrations
Jim Lloyd – artwork

References

1980 albums
Tony Rice albums
Ricky Skaggs albums
Sugar Hill Records albums